The Women's tandem sprint B at the 2018 Commonwealth Games, was part of the cycling programme, which took place on 5 April 2018. This event was for blind and visually impaired cyclists riding with a sighted pilot.

As only three nations entered the event, per Commonwealth Games regulations, no silver or bronze medal was available.

Records
Prior to this competition, the existing world and Games records were as follows:

Schedule
The schedule is as follows:

All times are Australian Eastern Standard Time (UTC+10)

Results

Qualifying
The two fastest tandems advance to the gold medal final.

Gold medal final

References

Women's tandem sprint B
Cycling at the Commonwealth Games – Women's tandem sprint B